The 2005 Omloop Het Volk was the 58th edition of the Omloop Het Volk cycle race and was held on 26 February 2005. The race started in Ghent and finished in Lokeren. The race was won by Nick Nuyens.

General classification

References

2005
Omloop Het Nieuwsblad
Omloop Het Nieuwsblad
February 2005 sports events in Europe